Days and Hours (Bosnian version title: Kod amidže Idriza) is a 2004 Bosnian film directed by Pjer Žalica and written by Namik Kabil. It was Bosnia and Herzegovina's submission to the 77th Academy Awards for the Academy Award for Best Foreign Language Film, but it was not nominated.

The film was released on 20 August 2004.

Cast
Senad Bašić as Fuke
Mustafa Nadarević as Idriz
Semka Sokolović-Bertok as Sabira
Emir Hadžihafizbegović as Ekrem
Jasna Žalica as Buba
Nada Đurevska as Begzada
Izudin Bajrović as Izudin
Dragan Marinković as Muhamed
Sanja Burić as Šejla
Enis Bešlagić as a youngster from the neighbourhood

See also

List of submissions to the 77th Academy Awards for Best Foreign Language Film

References

External links

2004 films
Bosnia and Herzegovina drama films
Bosnian-language films
2004 drama films